The Constitution of Mozambique is the basic law governing Mozambique. It was adopted on December 21, 2004 and amended in 2007.

External links
Constitution of Mozambique 

Mozambique
Politics of Mozambique